Eric Mazur (born November 14, 1954) is a physicist and educator at Harvard University, and an entrepreneur in technology start-ups for the educational and technology markets. Mazur's research is in experimental ultrafast optics, condensed matter physics and peer instruction. Born in Amsterdam, Netherlands, he received his undergraduate and graduate degrees from Leiden University.

Education
Mazur studied physics and astronomy at Leiden University. He passed his "doctoraal examen" (equivalent to a master's degree) in 1977 and continued his graduate studies at the same institution. His PhD thesis investigated the structure of non-equilibrium angular momentum polarizations in polyatomic gases.

Career and research
Although he intended to go on to a career in industry with Philips N.V. in Eindhoven, he left Europe at the urging of his father, Peter Mazur, to pursue a postdoctoral study with Nobel laureate Nicolaas Bloembergen at Harvard University. After two years as a postdoctoral researcher working with Bloembergen, Mazur was offered a position of assistant professor at Harvard University. In 1987 he was promoted to associate professor and obtained tenure three years later in 1990. Mazur currently holds a chair as Balkanski Professor of Physics and Applied Physics jointly in the Harvard School of Engineering and Applied Sciences and in the Physics Department. He is also the Dean of Applied Physics.

Mazur's early work at Harvard focused on the use of short-pulse lasers to carry out spectroscopy of highly vibrationally excited molecules. Mazur and his group have made many pioneering contributions to the field of ultrashort laser pulses and their interactions with matter ("femtosecond material science"). In 1989 his group was one of the first in academia to build a colliding-pulse mode-locked laser, which generated pulses of only 70 femtosecond duration. After early measurements by Mazur's group demonstrated conclusively that solids can undergo a structural phase transition without appreciable heating of the lattice, Mazur's group developed a technique to measure the full dielectric function of highly excited semiconductors. Since then the group's use of this technique and various nonlinear optical probes to study laser-induced structural phase transitions.

In parallel to the work on semiconductors, Mazur began studying the interaction of intense femtosecond pulses with transparent materials. By tightly focusing a laser pulse in the bulk of a transparent material nonlinear optical absorption occurs inside the material, leading to extreme high temperatures and material changes at the focus. This femtosecond laser micromachining technique is now widely used for data storage, fabrication of integrated optical components, and microsurgery.

In 1998 a serendipitous discovery in Mazur's laboratory led to the development of a new method to form a silicon surface modification, called "black silicon" because of its very low reflectivity. After irradiation by a train of femtosecond laser pulses in the presence of a halogen containing gas, the surface of silicon develops a self-organized microscopic structure of micrometer-sized cones. The resulting material has many remarkable properties, such as an enhanced absorption that extends to the infrared below the band gap of silicon. The material has found commercial applications in a number of photodetectors.

Mazur's research continues to focus on ultrashort laser pulse interactions and novel nonlinear optical devices. In collaboration with a group from Zhejiang University in Hangzhou, China, Mazur's group was the first to develop a  technique for pulling subwavelength diameter silica optical fibers. These wires guide light in the form of an evanescent wave, permit very sharp bending of the light.

Peer instruction
In 1991, Mazur began designing an instructional strategy for teaching called peer instruction.  In 1997, he published a book called Peer Instruction: A User's Manual which provides details on this strategy.

Peer Instruction (PI) has been found to be more beneficial than class-wide discussion or lecture.  In fact, according to an article in the March/April 2009 edition of Complexity, over 90% of instructors who have tried PI plan to continue to use it and incorporate it more into teaching. The seating arrangement plays an important role in the outcome of this method.  For example, when low-performing students are seated in the front, their chance to do better increases.  Meanwhile, the results of high-performing students who are seated in the back are not affected.  In addition, when high-performing students are seated in the outer four corners of the classroom, the performance of the class as a whole increases.

Entrepreneurship

Mazur has founded or co-founded at least two technology start-ups: SiOnyx, which makes infrared sensors, and Learning Catalytics, which in April 2013 he sold to the Pearson educational corporation.

Awards and honors
Mazur has been widely recognized for his scientific work and leadership.

 1988 – Awarded the Presidential Young Investigator Award by President Ronald Reagan.
 1989 – Elected a Fellow of the American Physical Society.
 1999 – Award for excellence in educational research by the Council of Scientific Society Presidents
 2006 – selected as one of 75 most outstanding American physicists by the American Association of Physics Teachers
 2008 – Awarded the Esther Hoffman Beller Medal by the Optical Society of America.
 2008 - Correspondent of the Royal Netherlands Academy of Arts and Sciences
 2014 - Minerva Prize for Advancement in Higher Education by Minerva University

References

External links

1954 births
Living people
21st-century American physicists
20th-century Dutch physicists
Dutch emigrants to the United States
Laser researchers
Leiden University alumni
Harvard University faculty
Scientists from Amsterdam
Members of the Royal Netherlands Academy of Arts and Sciences
Fellows of the American Physical Society
Optical physicists